Tez Kharab or Tezkharab may refer to:
 Tez Kharab, Shahin Dezh
 Tezkharab, Urmia

See also
 Tizkharab (disambiguation)